The Batplane, Batwing, Batjet or Batgyro is the fictional aircraft for the DC Comics superhero Batman. The vehicle was introduced in "Batman Versus The Vampire, I", published in Detective Comics #31 in 1939, a story which saw Batman travel to continental Europe. In this issue it was referred to as the "Batgyro", and according to Les Daniels was "apparently inspired by Igor Sikorsky's first successful helicopter flight" of the same year. Initially based upon either an autogyro or helicopter, with a rotor, the Batgyro featured a bat motif at the front. The writers gave the Batgyro the ability to be "parked" in the air by Batman, hovering in such a way as to maintain its position and allow Batman to return.

The Batgyro was soon replaced by the Batplane, which debuted in Batman #1, and initially featured a machine gun. The vehicle was now based on a fixed wing airplane rather than a helicopter, with a propeller at the front, although a bat motif was still attached to the nose-cone.  The Batplane has undergone constant revision since its first appearance, and has even been depicted as having the capability to traverse underwater. With the launch of the Tim Burton directed Batman film of 1989, the Batplane became known as the Batwing, a name which was carried over into the comics. Previously in Batman #300 the name Batwing was used in reference to a spacecraft. The 2012 film The Dark Knight Rises also adapted the Batplane to film, however, this time the vehicle was referred to as The Bat.

Background

Batman once maintained aircraft in his original Batcave. However, launching these planes so close to Wayne Manor's neighboring estates threatened to compromise Batman's secret identity. The Caped Crusader now "borrows" specially-modified jets and helicopters from Wayne Aerospace's business and military contracts.

Batplane I and the Bat-Rocket favored Batman's signature look over sleek aerodynamics.

Batplane II was a retooled needle-nosed Wayne Aerospace W4 Wraith fighter that married style with substance. In terms of design, it shares features with the Grumman F9F Cougar and McDonnell F-101 Voodoo. When the Batplane is stolen and triplicated by smugglers in Batman #61, Batman and Robin upgrade the Batplane to jet propulsion, adding at least "100 miles per hour" to its maximum speed.

Batplane III is a modified Wayne Aerospace SlipStream ($46 million sans "extras"). It is detailed to resemble a standard mid-size corporate jet during take-offs and landings.  Some of its features and capabilities are as follows:

At cruising altitude (35,000-45,000 ft.), telescoping wings retract. Exterior sections of tail and nose-cone envelop cockpit and cabin fuselage for higher altitude pressurization.
Gaining further altitude (45,000-55,000 ft.) delta fins in the tail and snub winglets elongate to increase efficiency and stability as speeds approach supersonic.
At ceiling altitudes (55,000-60,000 ft.) "smart" paint on exterior radar-shielding ceramics responds to dropping air pressure and temperature, thus camouflaging the Batplane's exterior to stealthy black.
Avionics include ergonomic "at-a-glance" viewing levels for all electronics and multifunction displays. The breakaway canopy allows for pilot/co-pilot emergency ejection. The reinforced acrylic glass canopy windows polarize at stealth altitude.

Technical specifications 
The aircraft's specifications are:
Height: 14.5 ft.
Length: 57.7 ft.
Wingspan: 47.6 ft. - The wings are protected by a bleed-air anti-icing system.
Altitude Ceiling: 60,000 ft.
Maximum Speed: 4,400 mph
Range: 2,486 n m
Take-Off Distance: 5,230 ft.
Landing Distance: 2,984 ft.
Payload: 2,670 lb.
Refueling Time: 7.8 minutes

In other media

Live-action films

Batman ('89) and Batman Forever
The Batwing appears in the movie Batman, used to combat the Joker. The Joker launches a deadly Smilex gas attack through large parade balloons at the Gotham City founding anniversary celebration. Batman arrives in the Batwing, steals the balloons and lets them loose in the atmosphere at a safe distance from the city.

Batman then returns to the city to confront the Joker directly. He fires off several missiles and two miniguns, killing many henchmen but narrowly missing his target. The Joker shoots the Batwing down with one bullet from his long barreled revolver. The Batwing crashes into a flaming wreck on the steps of Gotham Cathedral but a bruised and battered Batman survives, leading to the final climactic confrontation in the Cathedral's belfry.

After this, it was rebuilt and upgraded by the time of the events of Batman Forever and is used to combat the Riddler. As demonstrated when Riddler shot him down with a powerful green laser, the Batwing actually has an ejection pod which also doubles as a mini submarine. Both models of the plane are roughly bat-shaped, and were created with miniature effects. In the comic book adaptation of Batman Forever, the Batwing actually folds up into the Batboat.

In Batman, the Batwing was designed by Anton Furst and was constructed as a model by Derek Meddings. The vehicle was deliberately designed after the sickle-shape of the film's Bat-symbol. At least five models were created of the Batwing at various sizes and scales, with only one (that was seen burning on the Cathedral steps) created in full-scale. Other models included an 8 ft, fully automated model, a 2 ft model and a 1" model. A full-size segment of the cockpit was created in front of a blue-screen set for close-up shots of Michael Keaton piloting the craft. The redesign in Forever was devised by Barbara Ling and Matt Codd, having a ribbed body and tailfin similar to the movie's Batmobile.

The Dark Knight Trilogy 

An entirely new version of the Batwing appears in the film The Dark Knight Rises, referred to simply as the Bat. It is an unconventional, lightweight volantor-like craft with a ventrally mounted rotor. Developed by Lucius Fox, the Bat was originally intended for close-quarters urban military operations but instead becomes Batman's new primary vehicle. Fox notes that the Bat's autopilot function does not work but suggests that Bruce might be capable of fixing it. The vehicle is armed with machine guns, cannons and a variation of the EMP device he used chasing Bane's men. Batman first uses the Bat to escape pursuing police officers after being cornered in a dark alley. Immediately after, he uses it to rescue Selina Kyle from Bane's henchmen. Later in the film's climax, Batman uses the Bat in the fight to retake Gotham City from Bane and he uses the Bat to haul a fusion bomb away from Gotham City where it detonates over the ocean and presumably kills him. Later, while completing work on the Bat, Fox discovers that Wayne had fixed the autopilot function months before and may have escaped before the bomb detonated.

In designing the Bat, Nathan Crowley approached it as if it were an actual military project, emphasising the need for it to "fit into the same family" as the Tumbler and the Batpod. The final version of the Bat takes its design cues from the Harrier jump jet, Bell Boeing V-22 Osprey and the Boeing AH-64 Apache. Chris Corbould described the Bat's size and shape as presenting a major challenge for filming given Christopher Nolan's emphasis on practical effects over computer-generated imagery. In order to make the Bat "fly", it was variously supported by wires, suspended from cranes and helicopters, and mounted on a purpose-built vehicle with hydraulic controls to simulate movement.

Batman V Superman: Dawn of Justice 

The Batplane appears in the 2016 film Batman v Superman: Dawn of Justice. Here it is shown as a lightweight VTOL aircraft armed with machine guns and missiles, with a function that allows Alfred to remotely assume control from the Batcave. Batman uses the Batplane to infiltrate the warehouse where Martha Kent is held hostage, and later deploys its missiles to lure Doomsday away from Stryker's Island. This chase results in Doomsday using its heat vision to sever one of the Batplane's wings, causing it to crash-land.

The only physical part of the Batwing was a small portion of the cockpit, with the aircraft being rendered through computer graphics by Scanline VFX. As detailed by visual effects supervisor Bryan Hirota, the company had to build the Batwing out of only concept art, a model, and details of the set pieces, leading the crew to look through reference of military aircraft. The Northrop Grumman X-47B was a major influence for the aerodynamics, while the vertical takeoff and landing led to adopting a central fan/jet system as seen in the Lockheed Martin F-35 Lightning II.

Justice League 
The Batplane appears in a final cameo in the 2017 film Justice League.

Animation
The Batplane has appeared in the Super Friends cartoon series, where it was revealed to be a jet, and it was most often referred to as the Batjet, except for in season one. The classic Bat-Plane appears frequently in Batman: The Brave and the Bold. In The Batman, the Batwing is created in the episode "Thunder" to defeat Maxie Zeus. In the episode "Artifacts", Nightwing uses it to save a plane and crashes it on Freeze.

The Batwing briefly appeared in the Young Justice episode "Revelation", where Batman used it to help combat a giant plant monster created by the Injustice League. The Batwing is later seen again in the episode "Coldhearted", where Batman is using it to fly to a fortress in the sky.

The Batwing appeared in the Harley Quinn episode "Dye Hard", where Batman remotely pilots it to hunt down Parademons in Gotham, with Commissioner Gordon as a passenger and occasionally firing its weapons. Later in the episode, Gordon, Harley Quinn, and a reformed and sane Joker use it to escape from Doctor Psycho. In the following episode, "A Fight Worth Fighting For", Batman uses the Batwing to rescue Harley and Joker, now back to his old self, from the Parademons' nest.

DC Animated Universe

The Batwing also appears in Batman: The Animated Series, shaped like a stylized bat with very long wings that jut out past the "head" of the plane. The Batplane in The New Batman Adventures takes on a smaller, sleeker design shaped like a rocket with a curved wing on each side which also appeared in Justice League and Justice League Unlimited. In Batman Beyond, flying cars are commonplace and thus the Batmobile used by Terry McGinnis doubles as a plane.

Video games

Batman: Arkham 

The Batwing appears in Batman: Arkham Asylum, Batman: Arkham City and Batman: Arkham Knight, dropping off Batman's Batsuit, gadgets and upgrading the Batmobile.

A Batplane-like vehicle can be seen hanging from the ceiling and covered by a tarp inside the hidden Batcave under Arkham Island. Later in the game, Batman remotely pilots the Batplane to his location and has it drop off one of his gadgets, the Line Launcher. At the end of the game, Batman calls it again to leave for Gotham and apprehend Two-Face. When unlocked, the character trophy is called 'Batwing'. It also makes a cameo in the Batcave DLC. The Batwing has a more important role in the prequel Batman: Arkham Origins, where Batman is able use it to travel to other sections of Gotham City much quicker than he could on his own. Although he is required to disable enemy communication towers established by 'Enigma' in certain areas to signal the plane all over the city, once they have been destroyed, the plane can also take Batman to and from the Batcave.

Lego Dimensions 

A constructible Batwing comes packaged as part of The Lego Batman Movie Story Pack for Lego Dimensions; using it will unlock the vehicle for use in-game.

Other appearances

Lego Batman 
Lego's Lego Batman line includes one set which features an incarnation of the Batplane, though it goes by the name of "The Batwing" (7782 The Batwing: The Joker's Aerial Assault). The set is featured alongside the Joker's helicopter. Lego also made another set named (6863 Batwing battle over Gotham City) with the similar type of vehicles. In 2020, Lego produced the set 1989 Batwing, re-creating the vehicle from the 1989 movie.

Six Flags Over Texas 
The Gotham City section of Six Flags Over Texas includes a child focused amusement ride called "Batwing," which consists of two passenger seats that go in circles while also moving up and down.

See also
Batboat
Batcopter
Batcycle
Batmobile

References

External links
Action Figure Insider :: View topic - Which Batplane is the best?
Batman: Collected Issues of the Dark Knight - Batman #203
Batman: Yesterday, Today, & Beyond
History of the Batplane
A History of Other Batplanes - The Elseworlds

Fictional elements introduced in 1939